Crestline is an unincorporated community in Cherokee County, Kansas, United States. As of the 2020 census, the population of the community and nearby areas was 116. Crestline has a post office with ZIP code 66728.

History
Crestline was a station on the St. Louis–San Francisco Railway.

Demographics

For statistical purposes, the United States Census Bureau has defined Crestline as a census-designated place (CDP).

References

Further reading

External links
 USD 493, local school district
 Cherokee County maps: Current, Historic, KDOT

Unincorporated communities in Kansas
Unincorporated communities in Cherokee County, Kansas